A Boxpok is a steam locomotive wheel that gains its strength through being made of a number of box sections rather than having traditional solid spokes (the name is a variation on "box-spoke").  Being hollow, they allow better counterbalancing and stability  than conventional drivers, which is important for fast locomotives.  The Boxpok wheel was patented by General Steel Castings Corporation of Granite City, Illinois.

Other wheels
The Boxpok was the most common of the four disk wheels in use by US steam locomotive designers, the others being the Baldwin and Scullin. A fourth design, the Universal, was used in locomotive rebuilds. All vary slightly in appearance but are essentially the same in structure.

The term "Boxpok" is also sometimes used to describe the Bulleid Firth Brown (BFB) wheel in use on British railways at that time, but this is incorrect; while the BFB is similar to the Boxpok, one side of each box section is left open, so is not a true box structure unlike the Baldwin, Boxpok and Scullin drivers.

See also
SCOA-P wheel

References

 

Train wheels

de:Eisenbahnrad#Boxpok-Räder